Lampucchwa Tharu or Morangiya Tharu and Rajghariya Tharu is one of the endogamous subgroups of Tharu people which are an ethnic group indigenous to the Terai, the southern foothills of the Himalayas in Nepal and India. Likewise Morangiya Tharu dwells in the Eastern plain or Terai of Nepal. They can be found mainly in the districts of Morang and Sunsari. Though found in two districts, they are called by Morangiya Tharu as those two districts were one district before 1962. Within the group, they refer to themselves as Morangiya Tharu, but people from other regions would call them Lampucchwa (as the women have tail-like structures on their dress).

Distribution
The Lampucchwa Tharu people are distributed in Morang and Sunsari districts.

Culture

Food
They plant rice, mustard, corn and lentils, but also collect forest products such as wild fruits, vegetables, medicinal plants and materials to build their houses. They hunt deer, rabbit and wild boar, and go fishing in the rivers and oxbow lakes.
They keep domestics animals like cows, goats, pigs and water buffalo, and birds like pigeons, chickens and ducks. They live close to nature. 
A group of Tharu people who do not eat pig are said Thokra, and these people have a belief that if they consume such meat their kul devi becomes angry and can cause disease in their family. However, others do not have this belief.

Dress
Achra Khadki is the name of a traditional attire worn by women. Khadki is a hand-woven piece of cloth that is only made by the Dhimal community. Achra is fine cotton or any other special fabric which has beautiful handmade paintings. Generally, it is white in color but different colors are worn for different occasions. The Achra has a tail-like structure which is called Puccha.

Language
The Tharu language differs from other Tharu sub-groups.

Morangiya Tharu Title 
Sardar, Biswas, Majhi, Sikdar, Thandar, Mandal, Tabdar, Gachhedar, Akela, Khan, Bhagat, Modi, Chaudhary, etc.

Religion
The spiritual beliefs and moral values of the Tharu people are closely linked to the natural environment. The pantheon of their gods comprises a large number of deities that live in the forest, which the Tharu people ask for support before entering the forest.
The Tharu can also be found following Hinduism and Christianity nowadays, although some still have traditional beliefs on kul deuta.

Marriage System
They practice arranged marriage as well as love marriage.

References

Ethnic groups in India
Ethnic groups in Nepal